Senesi is an Italian surname derived from the city of Siena. Notable people with this surname include:

 Marcos Senesi (born 1997), Argentine football player
 Vauro Senesi (born 1955), Italian journalist and satirical cartoonist
 Yuri Senesi (born 1997), Italian football player

See also
 Senese

Italian-language surnames